Evgeny Sheyko (Russian: Евгений Борисович Шейко; 10 March 1962 – 19 November 2020), a Russian conductor, musical figure was Chief Conductor of Nizhny Novgorod State Academic Opera and Ballet Theatre (Nizhny Novgorod Award Winner).

Education

In 1988 Evgeny Sheyko graduated Moscow State Conservatory (faculty of opera and symphony conducting, Gennady Rozhdestvensky class).

Conducting
1988–92 – Conductor of Nizhny Novgorod State Academic Opera and Ballet Theatre
1993–95 – General artistic director and conductor of Nizhny Novgorod Chamber Orchestra
1995–2020 – General artistic director and conductor of Students Symphonic Orchestra of Nizhny Novgorod State Conservatory
2001–10 – Guest Conductor of opera and ballet festivals in Russian cities: Perm, Samara, Chelyabinsk, Krasnoyarsk, Cheboksary, Saratov
2004 – Guest Conductor of Ukraine State Symphonic Orchestra in Daegu (Republic of Korea)

Concert tours 

-with opera and ballet troupe of Nizhny Novgorod State Academic Opera and Ballet Theatre
1989 – Smolensk, Petrozavodsk (Russia)
1990 – Arkhangelsk, Murmansk (Russia)
1991 – Kyiv (Ukraine)

-with opera troupe of Nizhny Novgorod State Academic Opera and Ballet Theatre
1993 – Fort-de-France (France)
2006 – Cheboksary (Russia)
2008 – Kostroma (Russia)

-with orchestra, chorus, soloists of Nizhny Novgorod State Academic Opera and Ballet Theatre (symphonic programs)
2008 – Sarov (Russia)
2012 – Madrid, Barcelona, Málaga, Vigo (Spain), Lisbon, Porto (Portugal), Helsinki, Turku, Pori (Finland), Oslo, Stavanger (Norway), Stockholm (Sweden)

Repertoire 

-symphonies of Haydn, Mozart, Beethoven (all symphonies), Schubert, Brahms (all symphonies), Dvořák, Bruckner, Mahler, Sibelius, Honegger, Balakirev, Tchaikovsky (all symphonies), Rachmaninoff (all symphonies), Prokofiev, Shostakovich etc.
-symphonic compositions of Liszt, Wagner, R. Strauss, Grieg, Debussy, Dukas, Ravel, Bartók, Glinka, Mussorgsky, Rimsky-Korsakov, Stravinsky, Scriabin etc.
-instrumental concerts of Haydn, Mozart, Beethoven, Chopin, Liszt, Brahms, Dvořák, Grieg, Saint-Saëns, Sibelius, Tchaikovsky, Rachmaninoff, Scriabin, Prokofiev, Shostakovich etc.
-compositions for soloists, chorus and orchestra: Requiem by Mozart, Requiem by Verdi, “The Damnation of Faust” by Berlioz, “The Bells” by Rachmaninoff, “Alexander Nevsky” by Prokofiev, “Carmina Burana” by Orff etc.

Performance in Nizhny Novgorod State Academic Opera and Ballet Theatre 
1989 – “The Soldier's Tale” by Stravinsky
1990 – “The Tsar's Bride” by Rimsky-Korsakov
1991 – “Mazeppa” by Tchaikovsky
1994 – “The Gypsy Baron” by J. Strauss
1996 – “The Tales of Hoffmann” by Offenbach
1998 – “Aleko” by Rachmaninoff
2000 – “Ruslan and Ludmila” by Glinka
2001 – “La bohème” by Puccini
2002 – “The Bat“ by J. Strauss
2004 – “Carmen” by Bizet
2004 – “The Human Voice” by Poulenc
2004 – “Un ballo in maschera” by Verdi in Gwangju (Republic of Korea) 
2004 – “Turandot” by Puccini in Incheon (Republic of Korea)
2006 – “Ivan Susanin” (“A Life for the Tsar”) by Glinka
2007 – “The Queen of Spades” by Tchaikovsky
2008 – “Cio-Cio San” by Puccini
2010 – “Otello“ by Verdi
2011 – “The Nutcracker” by Tchaikovsky

Repertoire includes more than 50 operas and ballets.

References

External links
 E. Sheyko at Nizhny Novgorod State Academic Opera and Ballet Theatre (Rus)
 E. Sheyko at Nizhny Novgorod State Conservatory (Rus)
 Concert tour on ElClubExpress.com (Spain)
 Concert tour in Malaga (Spain)
 Concert tour in Oslo (Norw)
 Rhapsody "Porgy and Bess" for Piano and Orchestra

Soviet conductors (music)
1962 births
2020 deaths
Russian performers of early music
21st-century Russian conductors (music)
Russian male conductors (music)
21st-century Russian male musicians